Addington Vale is a  park situated in New Addington in the London Borough of Croydon. The park extends from King Henrys Drive in the north to Arnhem Drive in the south. It is bordered by Queen Elizabeths Drive to the west and Godric Crescent and Hares Bank to the east. The nearest Tramlink station is New Addington.

Facilities 

Two children's playgrounds
Car park
Multi-games court
Children's designated cycle area

History 

The land which subsequently formed Addington Vale was purchased through use of the 1936 Housing Act and in 1957 was declared Green Belt. It was appropriated as an open public space in 1963. Between then and 1970, the area was levelled by the use of landfill and topsoil added. The area was then planted and footpaths constructed, together with children's playgrounds and sports pitches.

See also

List of Parks and Open Spaces in Croydon
Addington Park
Addington Hills

References

External links
Addington Vale at croydon.gov.uk
Croydon Online

Parks and open spaces in the London Borough of Croydon